The Spirit Cave mummy is the oldest human mummy found in North America. He was said to be forty years old when he died. Analysis of the remains showed similarities to North and South American indigenous peoples and in 2016, the remains were repatriated to the Fallon Paiute-Shoshone Tribe of Nevada. The Spirit Cave mummy was one of the first to be dated using accelerated mass spectrometer radiocarbon dating. In turn, its discovery and analysis gave much insight and motivation of further research into the chronology of the western great basin.

Discovery

The Wheelers, working for the Nevada State Parks Commission, were surveying possible archaeological sites to prevent their loss due to guano mining. Upon entering Spirit Cave they discovered the remains of two people wrapped in tule matting. One set of remains, buried deeper than the other, had been partially mummified (the head and right shoulder). This partially mummified individual (actual Spirit Cave mummy) was found to be wearing moccasins and wrapped in a rabbit-skin blanket when laid to rest. The Wheelers, with the assistance of local residents, recovered a total of sixty-seven artifacts from the cave.

These artifacts were examined at the Nevada State Museum where they were initially estimated to be between 1,500 and 2,000 years old. They were deposited at the Nevada State Museum's storage facility in Carson City where they remained for the next fifty-four years.

Spirit Cave
Spirit Cave is at an elevation of 4,154 feet in the foothills of the Stillwater Mountains; the Stillwater National Wildlife Refuge is now established in this area. The location is to the northeast of Fallon, Nevada. Biological similarities between remains found in Spirit Cave have shown undeniable association to remains scattered across a wide geographic location such as the Wizard Beach man and Crypt Cave dog burial.

Dating
In 1996 University of California, Riverside anthropologist R. Ervi Taylor examined seventeen of the Spirit Cave artifacts using mass spectrometry. The results indicated that the mummy was approximately 9,400 years old (uncalibrated RCYBP; ~11.5 Kya calibrated) — older than any previously known North American mummy. Researchers estimate the death of this person to have occurred about 7420 B.C. The mummy was originally thought to be between 1,500 and 2,000 years old until mass spectrometry carbon dates were carried out.

The findings were published in the Nevada Historical Quarterly in 1997 and drew immediate national attention.

Repatriation and DNA Analysis
In March 1997, the Paiute-Shoshone Tribe of the Fallon Reservation and Colony
made a Native American Graves Protection and Repatriation Act (NAGPRA) claim of cultural affiliation with the artifacts.

In 2000, further study was unable to establish a definitive affiliation of the remains.

In September, 2006, the United States District Court for the District of Nevada ruled on a lawsuit by the Fallon Paiute-Shoshone Tribe and said that the Bureau of Land Management (BLM) made an error in dismissing evidence without a full explanation. The court order remanded the matter back to the BLM for reconsideration of the evidence.

In October 2015, Eske Willerslev collected bone and tooth samples from the remains with the permission of the Fallon Paiute-Shoshone Tribe.  DNA analysis indicated that the remains were similar to North and South American indigenous groups.  On November 22, 2016, the remains were repatriated to the tribe.
Willerslev attended the 2018 burial of the remains by the tribe.

In November 2018, researchers reported that the DNA sequencing of the remains were used in research about Paleoamericans (Y-haplogroup Q1b1a1a1-M848, mt-haplogroup D1).

Wizards Beach Man
The remains of a man from the same era, Wizards Beach Man, were also in the collection of the Nevada State Museum. The remains were radiocarbon dated at the same time. This turned out to be another early Holocene skeleton dating to almost exactly the same era.

Wizards Beach Man was found in 1978 at Wizards Beach on Pyramid Lake, about 100 miles (160 km) to the northwest from Spirit Cave. Radiocarbon dating has established that he lived more than 9,200 years ago.

Lovelock Cave, another important early site, is also nearby.

See also
Grimes Point
List of unsolved deaths

References

External links 

 Spirit Cave Man series from the Reno Gazette-Journal Offline as of 2010-April-18.

Churchill County, Nevada
Mummies
Oldest human remains in the Americas
Paiute
Shoshone
Native American history of Nevada